Fluorosis may refer to:

 Dental fluorosis, a disturbance of dental enamel caused by excessive exposure to high concentrations of fluoride during tooth development. 
 Skeletal fluorosis, a bone disease caused by excessive accumulation of fluoride in the bones
 Fluoride toxicity, elevated levels of the fluoride ion in the body